Natalya Shikolenko (born August 1, 1964 in Andizhan, Uzbekistan) is a  javelin thrower who represented USSR and later Belarus. She won an Olympic silver medal and a World Championship gold.

Her sister Tatyana Shikolenko is also a successful javelin thrower, first representing Belarus but switching to Russia in 1996.

Achievements

External links

1964 births
Living people
People from Andijan
Soviet female javelin throwers
Belarusian female javelin throwers
Athletes (track and field) at the 1992 Summer Olympics
Athletes (track and field) at the 1996 Summer Olympics
Olympic silver medalists for the Unified Team
Olympic athletes of the Unified Team
Olympic athletes of Belarus
World Athletics Championships medalists
World Athletics Championships athletes for the Soviet Union
World Athletics Championships athletes for Belarus
Olympic silver medalists in athletics (track and field)
Goodwill Games medalists in athletics
CIS Athletics Championships winners
Soviet Athletics Championships winners
World Athletics Championships winners
Medalists at the 1992 Summer Olympics
Competitors at the 1990 Goodwill Games